The Marudhu Pandiyars (Periya Marudhu and Chinna Marudhu) were Diarchal Kings of Sivagangai, Tamil Nadu, India, towards the end of the 18th century. They were known for fighting against the East India Company. They were finally executed by the EIC after being captured by them.

Childhood
Periya and Chinna Marudhu, sons of Mookiah Palaniappan Servai was native of Mukkulam, near Narikudi which was 18 miles away from Aruppukottai. Their mother Anandhayee alias Ponnathal was native of Pudhupatti near Sivagangai. Both the Brothers were born at Mukkulam in the year 1748 and 1753 respectively. The first son was named as Vellai Marudhu alias Periya Marudhu and the second son as Chinna Marudhu.

Rebellion
In 1772, British East India company had killed Muthuvaduganatha Thevar over his refusal to pay taxes. However Marudhu Pandiyar and Queen Velunachiyar escaped, and stayed with Gopala Nayak in Virupatchi for 8 years. After this time, an alliance of kingdoms led by the Pandiyar attacked Sivagangai and retook it in 1789. Both Maruthu Pandiyar were given high positions in the kingdom.

They were good at aerodynamics and craftsmanship and is said to have invented the Valari, a variant of the boomerang.

Death
The Marudhu Pandiyars, planned to war against East India Company in India. They gave the protection to Oomaithurai Kumaraswamy who was temporarily seeking refuge from the chaos of war. They along with the war leader Sivagangai and many of their family members, were captured at Cholapuram and were killed at Tiruppattur. They were hanged in the fort of Tirupputhur, which is now Sivaganga district, Tamil Nadu, on 24 October 1801. The burial of Maruthu Pandiyars is located at Sivagangai .

Honour
Maruthu Brothers are good in aerodynamics and invented many variants of spears and Valari. They also founded guerilla war tactic in India during the early stages of colonization. A commemorative postage stamp was released in October 2004. Every year people conduct Maruthu Pandiyars Guru Pooja at the Kalayarkovil temple in October.

Local Tamilians are also worshiping them and there is a temple dedicated and located at Batu Dua Mariamman Temple, Sungai Petani, Kedah at Malaysia.

A film was done about their lives in 1959: Sivagangai Seemai .

See also
 Indian independence activist
 Agamudayar
Mamannargal .maruthupandiargal
 Kalayar Kovil
Maruthupandiar varalaru Tamil
 Maveeran Oomaithurai Nayakar
 Rani Velu Nachiar
 Maveeran Veerapandiya Kattabomma Nayakar

References

1801 deaths
Indian revolutionaries
Year of birth missing
People from Tamil Nadu
Polygar Wars